Francis Turnbull Glasgow (17 August 1880 – 20 February 1939) was a New Zealand rugby union player. A loose forward, Glasgow represented Wellington, Taranaki, Hawke's Bay and Southland at a provincial level, and was a member of the New Zealand national side, the All Blacks, from 1905 to 1908 and played in the famous "Match of the Century" against Wales. He played 35 matches for the All Blacks including six internationals. His work as a Bank Officer included being Manager at Ohura.

Frank's grandfather was Rev Adam D.Glasgow, from Co Antrim.  He served as an Irish Presbyterian missionary to India from 1842 until 1855 (retired through ill health) and then in Dunedin New Zealand from November 1861 to March 1863.

References

1880 births
1939 deaths
Rugby union players from Dunedin
People educated at Wellington College (New Zealand)
New Zealand rugby union players
New Zealand international rugby union players
Taranaki rugby union players
Wellington rugby union players
Hawke's Bay rugby union players
Southland rugby union players
Rugby union flankers